Spescom Limited is an information and communications technology (ICT) Group listed on the Johannesburg Stock Exchange (JSE: SPS). Founded in 1977, it provides specialised business communication technology for a client base that includes telecoms providers (carriers and cellular network operators), broadcasters, contact centres, government and enterprises in various industry sectors.

Its offerings for these various industry sectors include design, supply and commissioning of infrastructure and applications; the development and delivery of integrated solutions; and the supply of hosted and managed services.

Three operating divisions have been established to serve these sectors:
 Spescom DataFusion – communications requirements in contact centres, enterprises
 Spescom Media IT – broadcasting sector
 Spescom Telecommunications – telecoms providers (carriers and network operators)

Two further divisions are:
 Spescom DataVoice – the company's R&D arm, which develops proprietary technology products (e.g., voice recording) to support contact centre and enterprise communication platforms
 New Telco South Africa – a carrier neutral co-location service provider for telecoms carriers

Spescom has a presence in South Africa, sub-Saharan Africa, Europe and the Middle East. It has a staff complement of 258, with offices in South Africa (Midrand, Cape Town and Durban), East Africa (Kampala, Uganda) and the UK (London).

History
Spescom was founded in September 1977 by Tony Farah with ZAR 4,000 capital. The company's initial focus was on test instrumentation, and it brought the world's first digital oscilloscope to South Africa in the same year.

In 1983, Spescom International Incorporated was established in Irvine, California by Gary Smith, a senior founding member of Spescom. The objectives of this international arm of the company were to maintain technical links with the company's suppliers, as well as to provide international marketing for products developed by Spescom. The company listed on the Johannesburg Stock Exchange on 4 June 1987. In September 1990 the company developed and introduced the world's first keypad prepayment electricity meter, Cashpower 2000, to South Africa. The device was licensed by meter manufacturers worldwide. In 1993, Spescom won its first major international tender for prepayment meters in Brazil. These meters are now sold in over thirty-five countries worldwide.

On 6 March 1995, the company formed a joint venture with Siemens called Energy Measurements, to provide a world centre of excellence in energy management and revenue collection systems, focusing on prepayment electricity metering. Spescom no longer has an interest in this market space.

In 2007, Spescom narrowed its focus, exiting its interest in the enterprise software sector with the sale of its US operation, Enterprise Informatics, to concentrate on the accelerating global trend towards the convergence of voice, video and data communications.
In 2008, the company introduced Libra Mobile, the first unified system combining mobile and fixed-line telephony recording.

In 2010, the company established NewTelco South Africa in partnership with NewTelco GmbH. NewTelco SA is a carrier neutral co-location service provider for local, regional and international carriers in South Africa. In mid-2010, the company established an office in Kampala, Uganda from which to launch its entry into East Africa. Today, Spescom is a major supplier to large African communication organisations including Telkom, Neotel and Sentech public South African and regional television and radio broadcasters; large financial institutions, public sector clients and some of the largest contact centres on the African continent.

Company structure
Spescom's operating divisions are:

Spescom DataFusion
Spescom DataFusion provides contact centre and enterprise telephony technology and services to medium and large organisations. It offers integrated business communication systems, hosted and managed services, system engineering and custom integration, support and SLA services, and training. Its customers include a large number of South Africa's top 200 companies. Key technology partners include Avaya, with whom it has Platinum Certification; Presence Technology; Spescom DataVoice; and Jacada.

Spescom DataVoice
Spescom DataVoice researches and develops proprietary technology products and systems that record, manage, re-create and analyse voice transactions, as well as software that addresses associated business processes–i.e., performance management, workforce optimisation and quality assurance. Spescom DataVoice's products – which include the Libra and Nexus voice and screen recording systems; Qnique, a performance management and workflow software; and Libra Mobile, a unified mobile and fixed-line recording system – are deployed in the United States, Europe, Middle East and Africa. Its customers include mid-sized and large enterprises, contact centres, trade floors, emergency services, utilities and government. Spescom DataVoice's systems are sold directly as well as through channel partners located in Africa, Europe and the Middle East.

Spescom Media IT
Spescom Media IT provides broadcast industry software, services and enabling technologies and equipment from image capture through to transmission. Its offering includes supply and implementation of relevant technology and equipment, as well as services such as consultation, design, planning, workflow analysis, project management, training, support, repairs and maintenance. Its key technology partners include Sony and Avid. Clients include SABC, Multichoice in South Africa, and Mauritius Broadcast Corporation, Swazi TV and Namibia Broadcast Corporation.

Spescom Telecommunications
Spescom Telecommunications is a systems integrator for fixed and mobile telecommunications network operators; utilities; transportation and government communications backbones; and for carrier network operators' transmission and access networks. Its services include planning, engineering, project management, procurement, logistics, installation, commissioning, testing, support and training. This is enabled by its team who provide services with systems integration, maintenance and migration of transport and access networks, as well as local support. This division counts major network operators and service providers among its customers. Key technology partners include ECI Telecom, Gilat Satellite Networks, Rad Data Communications, RadWin, Ceragon Networks and Light Pointe.

NewTelco South Africa
NewTelco South Africa is a one-stop shop for carrier-neutral co-location services provision created in partnership with NewTelco Gmbh. It provides an independent telecoms hub that offers local, regional and international carriers with a presence in South Africa the opportunity to interconnect with any other carriers subscribed to its hub – in a neutral setting. The hub is currently being built and equipped and will be located at Spescom's Midrand premises in South Africa. Its services launched at the end of 2010.

References

Information technology companies of South Africa
Companies listed on the Johannesburg Stock Exchange